Shaban Kheyl (also Romanized as Shā‘bān Kheyl; also known as Shabānqol) is a village in Poshtkuh Rural District, Chahardangeh District, Sari County, Mazandaran Province, Iran. At the 2006 census, its population was 17, in 5 families.

References 

Populated places in Sari County